Fernando Gutiérrez (died 1327) was a Roman Catholic prelate who served as Bishop of Cuenca (1326–1327) and Bishop of Córdoba (1300–1326).

Biography
On 12 Jul 1300, Fernando Gutiérrez was consecrated bishop by Niccolò Boccasini, Cardinal-Bishop of Ostia e Velletri. On 13 Jun 1300, Fernando Gutiérrez was appointed during the papacy of Pope Boniface VIII as Bishop of Córdoba. On 11 Apr 1326, he was appointed during the papacy of Pope John XXII as Bishop of Cuenca. He served as Bishop of Cuenca until his death in 1327.

References

External links and additional sources
 (for Chronology of Bishops)
 (for Chronology of Bishops)
 (for Chronology of Bishops) 
 (for Chronology of Bishops) 

14th-century Roman Catholic bishops in Castile
Bishops appointed by Pope Boniface VIII
Bishops appointed by Pope John XXII
1327 deaths